Codex Macedoniensis or Macedonianus designated by Y or 034 (in the Gregory-Aland numbering), ε 073 (von Soden), is a Greek uncial manuscript of the Gospels, dated palaeographically to the 9th century. The manuscript is lacunose.

Description 

The codex contains 309 parchment leaves. The text is written in one column per page, and 16 lines per column.

The codex contains almost complete text of the four Gospels with six lacunae (Matthew 1:1-9:11; 10:35-11:4; Luke 1:26-36; 15:25-16:5; 23:22-34; John 20:27-21:17).

The texts of Matthew 16:2b–3 (Signs of the Times) and Pericope Adulterae (John 7:53-8:11) are omitted.

The Greek text of this codex is a representative of the Byzantine text-type. Aland placed it in Category V.

History 

The manuscript was inadequately cited by Constantin von Tischendorf. The codex was acquired by Braithwaite, who described it in Expository Times in 1901. Gregory extracts from the collation of Braithwaite. According to von Soden, the manuscripts belongs to Ik-text. Kirsopp Lake found that this manuscript shares traits with Family Π.

According to Metzger this manuscript "deserves to be studied more thoroughly than has hithero been the case".

The codex is located in the Cambridge University Library (additional manuscripts 6594).

See also

 List of New Testament uncials
 Textual criticism
 Biblical manuscript

References

Further reading

External links 

 
Whole manuscript online, from Cambridge Digital Library

Macedoniensis, Codex
Macedoniensis, Codex
Manuscripts in Cambridge
Christianity in Cambridge